Dominic Wade (born April 12, 1990) is an American professional boxer.

Professional career
Wade was a featured fighter on Showtime's ShoBox: The New Generation when he fought Sam Soliman in a bout which he won, by split decision, to stay undefeated.

The IBF ordered a championship bout between current IBF champion Gennady Golovkin and top contender Dominic Wade after mandatory contender Tureano Johnson was unable to take the bout with Golovkin due to shoulder injury. The bout took place on April 23, 2016. Wade was knocked out in the second round.

Professional record 
 
| style="text-align:center;" colspan="9"|19 Wins (13 knockouts, 6 decisions), 1 Losses (1 knockouts, 0 decisions), 0 Draws'' 
|-  style="text-align:center; background:#e3e3e3;" 
|style="border-style:none none solid solid; "|
|style="border-style:none none solid solid; "|Result
|style="border-style:none none solid solid; "|Record
|style="border-style:none none solid solid; "|Opponent
|style="border-style:none none solid solid; "|Type
|style="border-style:none none solid solid; "|Round, time
|style="border-style:none none solid solid; "|Date
|style="border-style:none none solid solid; "|Location
|style="border-style:none none solid solid; "|Notes
|-align=center
|21
|Win
|20-1
|align=left| Josue Obando
||
||
|
|align=left|
|align=left|
|-align=center
|20
|Win
|19-1
|align=left| Martin Fidel Rios
||
||
|
|align=left|
|align=left|
|-align=center
|19
|Loss
|18-1
|align=left| Gennady Golovkin
||
||
|
|align=left|
|align=left|
|-align=center 
|18
|Win
|18–0
|align=left| Sam Soliman
|
|
|
|align=left|
|align=left|
|- align=center 
|17
|Win
|17–0
|align=left| Eddie Hunter
|
|
|
|align=left|
|align=left|
|-align=center
|16
|Win
|16–0
|align=left| Nick Brinson
| 
|
|
|align=left|
|align=left|
|- align=center
|15
|Win
|15–0
|align=left| Marcus Upshaw
| 
|
| 
|align=left| 
|align=left|
|- align=center 
|14
|Win 
|14–0
|align=left| Dashon Johnson
| 
| 
| 
|align=left| 
|align=left|
|- align=center 
|13
|Win 
|13–0
|align=left| Roberto Ventura 
| 
|
| 
|align=left| 
|align=left| 
|- align=center 
|12
|Win 
|12–0
|align=left| Marcus Brooks
| 
| 
| 
|align=left| 
|align=left|
|- align=center
|11 
|Win 
|11–0 
|align=left| Grover Young 
| 
| 
| 
|align=left| 
|align=left|
|- align=center 
|10
|Win 
|10–0 
|align=left| Brian Norman 
| 
| 
| 
|align=left| 
|align=left|
|- align=center 
|9
|Win 
|9–0 
|align=left| Freddie Montoya 
| 
| 
| 
|align=left| 
|align=left| 
|- align=center 
|8
|Win 
|8–0 
|align=left| Troy Lowry
| 
| 
| 
|align=left| 
|align=left| 
|- align=center 
|7
|Win 
|7–0 
|align=left| Michael Faulk 
| 
| 
| 
|align=left| 
|align=left| 
|- align=center 
|6
|Win 
|6–0 
|align=left| Robert Kliewer 
| 
| 
| 
|align=left| 
|align=left| 
|- align=center 
|5
|Win 
|5–0 
|align=left| Bradley Thompson 
| 
| 
| 
|align=left|
|align=left| 
|- align=center 
|4
|Win 
|4–0 
|align=left| Tyrone Dowdy 
| 
| 
| 
|align=left| 
|align=left| 
|- align=center 
|3
|Win 
|3–0 
|align=left| Anthony Cannon 
| 
| 
| 
|align=left| 
|align=left| 
|- align=center 
|2
|Win 
|2–0 
|align=left| Luis Hodge
| 
| 
| 
|align=left| 
|align=left| 
|- align=center
|1 
|Win 
|1–0 
|align=left| Chris Davis 
| 
| 
| 
|align=left| 
|align=left|
|- align=center

References

External links
 

Living people
1990 births
American male boxers
Middleweight boxers
Boxers from Washington, D.C.